Jamboree on the Trail, known by its acronym JOTT, is a co-ordinated international Scouting activity held annually, following on the idea of the Join-in events from the World Jamboree Year. Scouts from all over the world simultaneously participate in their local area by holding a hiking event. The event takes place on an annual basis on the 2nd Saturday in May.

Participants are awarded a JOTT badge as a recognition of having participated in this worldwide event. This provides the Scouts with a means of participating in an activity at the same time as fellow Scouts from around the world. It is an adjunct activity to the World Scout Jamboree as well as Jamboree on the Air and Jamboree on the Internet.

See also
Jamboree on the Air (JOTA)
Jamboree on the Internet (JOTI)
ScoutLink

References

External links
JOTT
JOTT UK
JOTT Finland
JOTT New Zealand
JOTT Badge Shop UK
Scouting jamborees